Francisco Elói dos Santos (29 July 1920 – 2000), known as Elói, was a Portuguese footballer who played as a full back.

Elói joined Benfica in 1938, winning one league and a cup in five years there. He then moved to Estoril Praia, staying there for 14 years.

Career
Born in Alhos Vedros on 29 July 1920, Elói started at Barreirense, before moving to Benfica in 1938, making his debut at the hands of János Biri on 8 October 1939, against Belenenses. He went on to appear in every game that Benfica played in that season, making 35 appearances, many of those alongside Gaspar Pinto, helping the club win the 1939–40 Taça de Portugal.

Elói's partnership with Gaspar Pinto was kept in 1940–41, but without the same success, as Benfica did not win anything. Still, he played every game possible, making 31 appearances. In 1941–42 he battled for a first team place with Ricardo Freire, appearing in 6 league games, as Benfica won the league. Elói left the club in 1942 after playing in 75 games, subsequently starting a long career at Estoril Praia.

Elói died in 2000, at the age of 80.

Honours
Benfica
Primeira Divisão: 1941–42
Taça de Portugal: 1939–40

References
General
 

Specific

1920 births
2000 deaths
People from Moita
Portuguese footballers
Association football defenders
Primeira Liga players
F.C. Barreirense players
S.L. Benfica footballers
G.D. Estoril Praia players
Sportspeople from Setúbal District